= Barbara Dobos =

Wyoming politician

Member of the Wyoming House of Representatives from the Natrona district
- In office 1983–1986

Barbara Dobos is an American politician. She was elected to represent the Natrona district in the Wyoming House of Representatives from 1983 to 1986.
